Thugs with Dirty Mugs is a 1939 Warner Bros. Merrie Melodies cartoon directed by Tex Avery. The short was released on May 6, 1939.

The title is derived from the Warner Bros.' 1938 acclaimed feature film, Angels with Dirty Faces. It is similar to Avery's later MGM crime/detective-oriented cartoon Who Killed Who?

Plot
The film takes place in the fictional New York town of Everyville, which is home to a vast total of 112 banks.

The title card and technical credits are followed by introductions of the two lead characters: "F.H.A. (Sherlock) Homes" as police chief "Flat-Foot Flanigan with a Floy Floy," and "Edward G. Robemsome" (a caricature of Edward G. Robinson) as notorious gang leader "Killer Diller." After these introductions, Killer and his gang are seen robbing every bank in the town in numerical order (except that they skip the 13th bank out of superstition) — with the newspaper Telegraph Post reporting the criminals' every move, and even declaring that they have robbed 87 banks in a single day. Despite the criminals' predictability and their endless sight gags (in which Killer does everything from causing one bank to behave like a casino machine to picking up a pay phone and inserting his gun into the speaker, resulting in the operator shrieking in terror and giving him many coins), the police are unable to arrest them. However, after so much bafflement, Flanigan himself gets help from an unlikely source: a man in the front of the theatre who had been sitting through the whole picture; he tells him that Killer is making plans to go to the estate of Mrs. Lotta Jewels at 10:00 in the evening. While Killer and his gang are spending time in said estate, listening to "The Lone Stranger" on radio, Flanigan and his men are poised inside and make their move to capture the criminals, firing at them. Thus, Killer is captured, convicted, and given a long sentence — which is revealed to be a prison term in which he must write standards ("I've been a naughty boy") on a blackboard one thousand times, much like schoolkids of that era. The imprisoned Killer blows a raspberry as the cartoon irises out.

Reception
The cartoon was banned in  Winnipeg, Manitoba in 1939, because censors "felt the film was just an excuse to show criminal activity."

Animation historian Greg Ford calls Thugs with Dirty Mugs "an Avery treatise on movie gangsterdom that insightfully satirizes the live-action crime thrillers being made at the Warner Bros. studios during this period... The real secret behind Thugs with Dirty Mugs''' durability lies in the spot-on accuracy with which the cartoon reconstructs the trappings of Warner's gangster films."

Home mediaThugs with Dirty Mugs was released uncut and restored on the Looney Tunes Golden Collection: Volume 3''.

See also 
Looney Tunes and Merrie Melodies filmography (1929–1939)

References

External links

Merrie Melodies short films
Warner Bros. Cartoons animated short films
1939 animated films
1939 films
Films directed by Tex Avery
American crime comedy films
Animation based on real people
Cultural depictions of Edward G. Robinson
1930s Warner Bros. animated short films